"No One" (stylized in all caps) is a song recorded by South Korean singer Lee Hi featuring B.I of iKon from Lee's first EP 24°C. It was released on May 30, 2019, by YG as the lead single from the EP. It is Lee's first single (as the lead artist) since her three-year hiatus following the release of her second studio album in 2016.

Background and composition
The single and EP were announced on May 20. It was written by Yoon Myung Woon, Kim Min Gu, and iKON’s B.I. No One tells a story about the person who's lonely and wants to be with someone.

Critical reception
"No One" has been described as a reggaeton-infused, dance track with a groovy tune full of vibrant percussion, smooth melodies, and quirky synths.

Track listing 
 Digital download and streaming
 "No One (누구없소)" – 3:15

Music video
The music video teaser was released on May 27, 2019.
The official music video was released on May 30, 2019. As of February 2023, it has over 65 million views on YouTube and 52 million streams on Spotify.

Accolades

Music program awards

Charts

See also
 List of Inkigayo Chart winners (2019)
 Lee Hi discography
 List of M Countdown Chart winners (2019)

Release history

References

2019 singles
2019 songs
Lee Hi songs
Korean-language songs